Velyka Mykhailivka Raion was a raion (district) in Odesa Oblast of Ukraine. Its administrative center was the urban-type settlement of Velyka Mykhailivka. The raion was abolished on 18 July 2020 as part of the administrative reform of Ukraine, which reduced the number of raions of Odesa Oblast to seven. The area of Velyka Mykhailivka Raion was merged into Rozdilna Raion. The last estimate of the raion population was

History
The area was settled after 1792, when the lands between the Southern Bug and the Dniester were transferred to Russia according to the Iasi Peace Treaty. In particular, the settlement of Hrosulove was founded in 1793. The area was included in Tiraspol Uyezd, which belonged to Yekaterinoslav Viceroyalty until 1795, Voznesensk Viceroyalty until 1796, Novorossiya Governorate until 1803, and Kherson Governorate until 1920.

On 16 April 1920, Odessa Governorate split off, and Odessky Uyezd was moved to Odessa Governorate. In 1923, uyezds in Ukrainian Soviet Socialist Republic were abolished, and the governorates were divided into okruhas. Hrosulove was included into Odessa Okruha. On 7 March 1923 Hrosulove Raion with the administrative center in Hrosulove was established. In 1930, okruhas were abolished, and on 27 February 1932, Odessa Oblast was established, and Hrosulove Raion was included into Odessa Oblast. In 1946, Hrosulove was renamed Velyka Mykhailivka, and Hrosulove Raion was renamed Velyka Mykhailivka Raion.

On 7 March 1923 Tsebrykove Raion with the administrative center in Tsebrykove was established as well. On 30 December 1962 Tsebrykove Raion was abolished and merged into Velyka Mykhailivka Raion.

References

Former raions of Odesa Oblast
States and territories established in 1923
1923 establishments in Ukraine
Ukrainian raions abolished during the 2020 administrative reform